Domingo Rafael Tamargo y Bautista (2 May 1883 – 1947) was the Cuban Secretary of Justice during the early 1930s. He served on the Cuban Supreme Court from September 27, 1933 until January 17, 1934.

Tamargo was born in Matanzas, Cuba to a wealthy Spaniard, Manuel Antonio Tamargo y Gonzalez (1836–1914), and Cuban Ana Josefa Bautista y Valera.  He married Gloria Sanchez del Montes and they had four children, Ana Gloria (1910–1996), Domingo (1913–2002), Alberto (1917–1984), and Margarita Tamargo-Sanchez (1915–2005).

References
  (Spanish)

  (Spanish)

Government ministers of Cuba
1883 births
1947 deaths